Heriberto Manuel Galindo Quiñones (born 20 March 1951) is a Mexican politician and diplomat affiliated with the PRI. As of 2013 he served as Deputy of the LVI and LXII Legislature of the Mexican Congress representing Sinaloa.

Between 2000 and 2001 he served as Ambassador of Mexico to Cuba.

References

1951 births
Living people
Ambassadors of Mexico to Cuba
Institutional Revolutionary Party politicians
20th-century Mexican politicians
21st-century Mexican politicians
Politicians from Sinaloa
People from Guamúchil
National Autonomous University of Mexico alumni
Deputies of the LXII Legislature of Mexico
Members of the Chamber of Deputies (Mexico) for Sinaloa